In cryptography, MDC-2 (Modification Detection Code 2, sometimes called Meyer–Schilling, standardized in ISO 10118-2) is a cryptographic hash function. MDC-2 is a hash function based on a block cipher with a proof of security in the ideal-cipher model. The length of the output hash depends on the underlying block cipher used.

Algorithm 
For a given message  to hash and a given block cipher encryption function , the MDC-2 algorithm proceeds as follows. Let  be the block length,  two different constants of size . If  where each  has size , then the hash  of the message is given by:

return

MDC-2DES hashes
When MDC-2 uses the DES block cipher, the 128-bit (16-byte) MDC-2 hashes are typically represented as 32-digit hexadecimal numbers. is chosen as the 8-byte string 5252525252525252 and is chosen as the 8-byte string 2525252525252525 (written as hexdigits).

The following demonstrates a 43-byte ASCII input (which is padded with five zero-bytes so its length is a multiple of the DES block size of 8 bytes) and the corresponding MDC-2 hash:

  MDC2("The quick brown fox jumps over the lazy og") 
   = 000ed54e093d61679aefbeae05bfe33a

Even a small change in the message will (with probability) result in a completely different hash, e.g. changing d to c:

  MDC2("The quick brown fox jumps over the lazy og") 
   = 775f59f8e51aec29c57ac6ab850d58e8

The hash of the zero-length string is:

  MDC2("") 
   = 52525252525252522525252525252525

Patent issues

Because of patent concerns support for MDC-2 has been disabled in OpenSSL on most Linux distributions and is not implemented by many other cryptographic libraries. It is implemented in GPG's libgcrypt.

The patent was due to expire on August 28, 2007, twenty years after the filing date. It actually expired in 2002 because IBM did not pay the renewal fee. The Canadian patent was not renewed and no European patent was granted so MDC-2 can now be freely used.

See also 
 One-way compression function

Notes

Cryptographic hash functions